The government of Alejandro García Padilla was formed in the weeks following the 2012 Puerto Rico gubernatorial election and was sworn in initially in January of 2013, with some confirmations coming in later. It featured a pro-Independence secretary, a non-partisan Secretary of Governance, as well as the continuation of the previous PNP administrations' Commissioner of Safety and Public Protection.

Party breakdown 
Party breakdown of 21 cabinet members, not including the governor, but including the Secretary of Governance, from January 2013 to September 2014:

The cabinet was composed of members of the PPD, a PIP member (in defiance to PIP leadership), and at its height, two concurrent independents or technical positions (or people whose membership in a party was not clearly ascertained from any available media). After the exit of Ingrid Vila Biaggi in September 2014, the PPD gained a seat in the Cabinet at the expense of the independent position she left for Víctor Suárez Meléndez:

Members of the Cabinet 
The Puerto Rican Cabinet is led by the Governor, along with, starting in 1986, the Secretary of Governance. The Cabinet is composed of all members of the Constitutional Council of Secretaries, who are the heads of the  executive departments, along with other Cabinet-level officers who report directly to the Governor of Puerto Rico or to the Secretary of Governance, but who are not heads nor members of  an executive office. All the Cabinet-level officers are at the same bureaucratic level as of the Secretaries

Notes

References 

Government of Puerto Rico
Governors of Puerto Rico
Members of the Cabinet of Puerto Rico by session
Cabinet of Puerto Rico